Senee Kongtong (born 16 October 1976) is a Thai sprinter. He competed in the men's 4 × 400 metres relay at the 2000 Summer Olympics.

References

1976 births
Living people
Athletes (track and field) at the 2000 Summer Olympics
Senee Kongtong
Senee Kongtong
Southeast Asian Games medalists in athletics
Place of birth missing (living people)
Senee Kongtong
Athletes (track and field) at the 1998 Asian Games
Athletes (track and field) at the 2002 Asian Games
Competitors at the 2001 Southeast Asian Games
Senee Kongtong
Senee Kongtong
Senee Kongtong